Ruth Dreifuss (born 9 January 1940 in St. Gallen) is a Swiss politician affiliated with the Social Democratic Party. She was a member of the Swiss Federal Council from 1993 to 2002, representing the Canton of Geneva. 

She was elected to the Swiss Federal Council on 10 March 1993 as the 100th member elected since the foundation of the federal state.

Biography  

Dreifuss belongs to one of the oldest Jewish families in Switzerland. Her father was a merchant. Both Ruth and her elder brother went to school. After business education, Ruth worked as a secretary and social worker. Also, she was a journalist at Cooperation from 1961 to 1964. She joined the Socialist Party (SP) in 1964. In 1970 she obtained a Master of Economics at the University of Geneva; and was an assistant at the university from 1970 to 1972. Between 1972 and 1981, she was scientific expert at the Federal Swiss Agency for Development and Cooperation. Also, Dreifuss elected Secretary of the Swiss Trade Union, where she dealt with matters related to social insurance, labor law and women's issues, until her election to the Swiss Federal Council in 1993.

Dreifuss was a social-democratic member of the City of Bern's Legislative Assembly from 1989 to 1992. She missed out the election to the National Council of Switzerland in 1991.

She is a member of the Council of Women World Leaders, an International network of current and former female leaders whose mission is to mobilize the highest-level women leaders globally for collective action on issues of critical importance to women and equitable development.

Election to the Federal Council 

After the resignation of René Felber from the Swiss Federal Council, a member of the Social Democratic Party was supposed to be elected, according to the unofficial "magic formula" used to determine the representation of the Swiss parties at the Federal Council. While Christiane Brunner was the Social Democratic Party's official candidate for the election on 3 March 1993, the right-wing parties decided to back another member of the Social Democratic Party, Francis Matthey, a member of the national parliament and a Minister of the Canton of Neuchâtel at that time who declined election, as his party did not support it.

A new election was organized on 10 March 1993, and the Social Democratic Party presented both Ruth Dreifuss and Christiane Brunner as the two official candidates. It was the first time that two women were on the official "ticket" for election, and Ruth Dreifuss was elected on the 3rd round with 144 votes.

Political actions undertaken 

Ruth Dreifuss held the Federal Department of Home Affairs until her resignation on 31 December 2002. She was the first woman ever to be elected President of the Confederation from 1 January to 31 December 1999.

She won several referendums, including a revision of the Health Insurance Bill, the 10th revision of the social security system, a drug policy based on prevention, therapy, help and rehabilitation, and a new law regarding the film industry and its development. The 4-pillar policy was also aimed at reducing the spread of the AIDS epidemic, especially with a new policy regarding the supply of clean syringes.

She worked on a Maternity Insurance law, but since the majority of the Federal Council rejected the proposal, she had to ask the people to reject her own text, as she had to respect collegiality.

She is a member and former chair of the Global Commission on Drug Policy and a member of International Commission Against the Death Penalty.

Bibliography 

 Dreifuss ist unser Name (Dreifuss is our name), by Isabella Maria Fischli, Ed. Pendo, 2002, .
 "Ruth Dreifuss" in Women of power - half a century of female presidents and prime ministers worldwide, by Torild Skard, Bristol: Policy Press, 2014, .

References

External links 

 Ruth Dreifuss in History of Social Security in Switzerland

Legacy interview. . Personal history interview
Time to Abolish Drug-Related Death Penalty by Ruth Dreifuss. HuffPost. Published 13 October 2015. Updated 6 December 2017.

|-

|-

|-

Members of the National Council (Switzerland)
Women members of the National Council (Switzerland)
Members of the Federal Council (Switzerland)
Women members of the Federal Council (Switzerland)
1940 births
Living people
Jewish Swiss politicians
Anti–death penalty activists
Drug policy reform activists
Female interior ministers
Women presidents
People from St. Gallen (city)
Social Democratic Party of Switzerland politicians
20th-century Swiss women politicians
20th-century Swiss politicians
21st-century Swiss women politicians
21st-century Swiss politicians
20th-century women rulers
Jewish socialists
Winners of the Stockholm Prize in Criminology